Eighteen Mile Creek is the name of several small rivers. 

In Australia
 Eighteen Mile Creek (Queensland), a small watercourse in Queensland. 
 Eighteen Mile Creek (Victoria), a tributary of the Dargo River in Victoria.

In the United States
 
 Eighteen Mile Creek (Niagara County), a small river in Niagara County, New York.  
 Eighteen Mile Creek (Erie County), a small river in Erie County, New York. 
 Eighteen Mile Creek (Idaho), a small river in Caribou County, Idaho. 
 Eighteen Mile Creek (South Carolina), a small river in South Carolina. 
 Eighteen Mile Creek (West Virginia), a small river in Mason and Putnam Counties, West Virginia. 
 Eighteen Mile Creek (Wisconsin), within the Chequamegon-Nicolet National Forest, Bayfield County, Wisconsin.